Ickburgh is a village and civil parish in the English county of Norfolk. The population (including Cranwich) and Didlington was 309 in 134 households at the 2011 Census. The parish shares boundaries with the adjacent parishes of Hilborough, Foulden, Didlington, Mundford, Lynford and Stanford. The parish falls within the district of Breckland. Local government responsibilities are shared between the parish, district and county councils.

The villages name means 'Ic(c)a's fortification'.

References

http://kepn.nottingham.ac.uk/map/place/Norfolk/Ickburgh

Villages in Norfolk
Civil parishes in Norfolk
Breckland District